North Cave Wetlands is a nature reserve at North Cave, East Riding of Yorkshire, England, managed by the Yorkshire Wildlife Trust.

The reserve based at Dryham Lane is 40 hectares in size and comprises six lakes, restored from a former sand and gravel quarry. There are five bird hides. Expansion is eventually planned, onto additional pits, which are currently still being quarried.

References

External links 

 Yorkshire Wildlife Trust page
 Bird sightings

Protected areas of the East Riding of Yorkshire
Nature reserves in the East Riding of Yorkshire
Yorkshire Wildlife Trust reserves
Wetlands of England